Lena Margareta Stone (née Larsson; born 27 February 1962 in Boden, Sweden) is a Swedish actress.

Selected filmography
1997 – Skärgårdsdoktorn (TV)
2000 – Soldater i månsken (TV)
2000 – Pistvakt – En vintersaga (TV)
2003 – Kommer du med mig då
2004 – The Return of the Dancing Master (TV)
2006 – LasseMajas detektivbyrå (TV series)
2006 – Kronprinsessan (TV)
2008 – LasseMajas detektivbyrå – Kameleontens hämnd
2009 – Män som hatar kvinnor

References

External links

Margareta Stone on Swedish Film Database

Swedish actresses
Living people
1962 births
People from Boden Municipality